

A list of waters of the South Ossetia

On the territory of South Ossetia is part of Keli Highland, which is the second by the number of lakes in the Caucasus.

Notes

All data obtained by Google Earth.

South Ossetia